Valmozzola is a comune (municipality) in the Province of Parma in the Italian region Emilia-Romagna, located about  west of Bologna and about  southwest of Parma.

Valmozzola borders the following municipalities: Bardi, Berceto, Borgo Val di Taro, Solignano, Varsi.

References

Cities and towns in Emilia-Romagna